Noah Lomax (born November 7, 2001) is an American actor. Among his prominent roles are: Lewis in the film Playing for Keeps, Josh in the film Safe Haven, and Louis Morales in the TV series The Walking Dead.

Early life, family and education
Lomax was born in New Orleans, Louisiana. He has resided in Atlanta since age five. His older sister, Maddie, is also an actress, and the two have performed at least three times onscreen together.

Career
Lomax has worked on numerous television commercials. His first success in acting was in a 2009 episode of the TV series Army Wives. Since then he has appeared on other TV series, including Drop Dead Diva, The Middle, Mad Love, and Bones.

An early uncredited role for Lomax was playing the minor role of Louis Morales in a few episodes of The Walking Dead. His older sister, Maddie Lomax, plays Louis's older sister, Eliza. In 2012, he landed his first starring role in the film by Gabriele Muccino, Playing for Keeps. In 2013, he played the role of Josh in the film based on the Nicholas Sparks novel Safe Haven.

On January 6, 2014, Lomax joined the cast of the film 99 Homes to play Connor Nash, Andrew Garfield's character's son.

In The SpongeBob Movie: Sponge Out of Water (2015), Lomax played the role of Mikey.

Filmography

References

External links
 

Living people
2001 births
21st-century American male actors
American male child actors
Male actors from Atlanta
Male actors from New Orleans